Pavitra Prema is a 1998 Indian Telugu film directed by Muthyala Subbaiah. The film stars Nandamuri Balakrishna, Laila, Roshini with music composed by Koti. The film was produced by V. Srinivasa Reddy under Srinivasa Productions. The film was a box office success.

Plot 
The film begins with Manikyam a stout-hearted humanitarian who devoted his life to the Goddess Gaajulamma and aims to build a temple for her. To endeavor it, he walks along with his friends Rani, Simhadri, & Kathari. At every level, he foils with heinous corporator Ghanta Ratthaiah and shields the general public from his violations. After a few years, Manikyam turns into a tycoon and the city deifies him. He also succeeds in constructing a huge temple for his goddess. Meanwhile, Ratthaiah conspires to squat a hospital administrated by a good soul Dr. Shakuntala Devi with gratis. Manikyam upholds her in that quandary, and they befriend him. Aside from that, he dotes on his sister Swapna who loves a guy, Ravi. Manikyam decides to knit them while proceeding to her engagement he is assaulted by the fouls and gravely injured. Fortuitously, Shakuntala resurrects him.

The next, Manikyam swears to bestow her whatsoever where Shakuntala seeks him a favor and spins back. After completing of studies, her elders arranged a fine match and she moves to card distribution. Accordingly, at Nagarjuna Sagar she is groped by a devil, as a result, the nuptial is nullified and also proves fatal to her family. As of now, she is vengeful to see his blood. The single lead to catch hold of him is his name Kaali, tattooed on his hand. At once, Manikyam is baffled and woes out of contrition because Kaali is none other than himself. Previously, Manikyam labored at Nagarjuna Sagar to venerate his mother he tats her the name Kaali. One night, under intoxication and distortion he mauled Shakuntala. Forthwith, becoming conscious he scurries for her but fails to find her. Thus, Manikyam self-reproaches and burns his mother's name. Moreover, in the scrimmage, he receives the bangles of Shakuntala for which he has launched the temple as a symbol of his divine love.

Now, Manikyam seeks for two months to conceal the truth to get off from his responsibilities. At the time of Ravi & Swapna's wedding, Shakuntala is subjected to opprobrium by the guests when Manikyam declares her eminence. Overwhelmed Manikyam moves to divulge the actuality and calls Shakuntala to the temple. In tandem, he hears that Ratthaiah is going to contest in Mayor Elections with the support of MLA Rayudu. At the request of the public, Manikyam accepts to oppose them when they again onslaught on him and he is hurt hard. However, holding his breath he lands at Shakuntala, confesses his sin, announces his idolization of her, and collapses. Despite, being aware of reality Shakuntala rescues him one more time. Then, he asks the reason for her magnanimity whilst she shows the baby born to them and entrusts her to him. Contrariwise, Ratthaiah knows and exploits it for his political gain when Shakuntala steps into fathoms Manikyam's excellence. Nevertheless, Manikyam proclaims his offense when the public asks him to get marry Shakuntala. At last, Manikyam ceases the baddies. The movie ends on a happy note with the marriage of Manikyam and Shakuntala.

Cast

Soundtrack

The music for the film was composed by Koti and released on Supreme Music Company.

References

External links
 

1998 films
1990s Telugu-language films
Indian romantic drama films
Films scored by Koti
Films directed by Muthyala Subbaiah
1998 romantic drama films